The Wüst Seahawk is a German amateur-built flying boat under development by Wüst GmbH. The aircraft is intended to be supplied as a kit for amateur construction.

Design and development
The Seahawk was originally the Mark Flugzeugbau Shark, but that company went out of business and Wüst continued development of the design.

The Seahawk features a cantilever shoulder-wing, a two-seats-in-side-by-side configuration enclosed cockpit, retractable tricycle landing gear and a single engine in pusher configuration, mounted in a pod above the wing.

The aircraft is made from composites. Its wing mounts downturned wing tips that incorporate floats for water operations. The standard engine used is the  Rotax 914 four-stroke turbocharged powerplant. The highly swept fin mounts the tailplane high, in a nearly T-tailed configuration. The hull incorporates a built-in step.

The aircraft prototype first flew on 29 March 2003, and a second prototype was completed. A third prototype was under construction in Africa in 2010. The company indicated that kit production would likely take place in the Czech Republic.

Since 2010 the company website has disappeared and development of the Seahawk may have ceased.

Specifications (Seahawk)

References

 

Homebuilt aircraft
Single-engined pusher aircraft
Shoulder-wing aircraft
Flying boats
2000s German sport aircraft
Aircraft first flown in 2003